Walters State Community College (abbreviated as WSCC, and commonly known as Walters State) is a public community college based in Morristown, Tennessee.  It was founded in 1970 and is  operated by the Tennessee Board of Regents.  The college was named in honor of former United States Senator Herbert S. Walters.

The college serves ten predominantly rural East Tennessee counties, located in the area of the Clinch and Great Smoky Mountains with five campuses totaling approximately 6,200 degree-seeking, commuting students. The college offers over 100 programs of study, ranging from transfer programs to four-year universities, to two-year associates and technical certificate programs.

History
In 1957, the Pierce-Albright Report was presented to the Tennessee legislature, detailing situations of higher education in the state. It showed many citizens of the state of Tennessee to be without sufficient access to colleges and universities, and led to the allocation of $200,000 in 1963 to implement the recommendations of the report.

The State Board of Education developed a plan to locate community colleges in the underserved regions of Tennessee within a reasonable distance of travel to the majority of residents in each region. In 1965, the Tennessee General Assembly certified the establishment of the first wave of these institutions. In 1970, Walters State Community College became the sixth college created in this process, named for former U.S. Senator Herbert S. Walters who was responsible for the development of a community college in Morristown.

Walters State was accredited by the Southern Association of Colleges in 1972, and received reaffirmation of accreditation in 1976, 1987 and 1997.

In 2017, a hiking-mountain biking trail system would be constructed at the main campus at a natural area surrounding the college's public safety complex.

Presidents
Dr. James W. Clark, was appointed as the first president of Walters State Community College in 1969 and served in that capacity until 1974. While classes were held in temporary quarters in Morristown during the first year of the college's operation, Dr. Clark oversaw the completion of The College Center, the first building built on the campus and opened in 1971.
Dr. Jack E. Campbell, who was hired in 1974 to succeed Clark, was considered one of the youngest college presidents at the time.  Under his leadership, the campus expanded from the one campus location in Morristown with a population of 1,736 students to having four campuses, with a total student population of 6,000 credit degree-seeking students and 5,000 students in non-degree, job training and continuing education courses at the time of his retirement in 2005. The College Center would be renamed in Dr. Campbell's honor.
Dr. Wade B. McCamey, who had previously been the president of Roane State Community College and previously served as vice-president of academic affairs at Walters State Community College, was selected in 2005 and has served in that capacity until 2016.  During his tenure, the college experienced more growth and expansion through the building of additional facilities on the Sevierville Campus, the Morristown campus (with one of the facilities named the Dr. Wade B. McCamey Student Services building upon his retirement) and the Greeneville-Greene County campus(Named The Niswonger Campus for Greeneville Philanthropist, Scott Niswonger).
Dr. Anthony (Tony) Miksa, was named the fourth president of Walters State in May 2016, and his tenure began on June 1.

Athletics
Walters State's athletics programs are part of both the National Junior College Athletic Association (NJCAA) and the Tennessee Community College Athletic Association (TCCAA). The teams are known as the Senators or Lady Senators, with the team colors being red, white, and blue.

Campuses
The Tennessee Board of Regents designates ten counties as being served by Walters State Community College:

Claiborne
Cocke
Grainger
Greene
Hamblen
Hancock
Hawkins
Jefferson
Sevier
Union

As its reach extends across a geographically large region, there are four campuses of Walters State Community College. The primary campus is located in Morristown, while satellite branches are found in Sevierville, Greeneville, and New Tazewell. In mid-2010, the Claiborne extension moved into the former Claiborne County High School building. In late 2020, Walters State opened a campus in Cocke County, at the Tanner Building in Newport.

List of Campuses
 Morristown (Main Campus)
 Greeneville (Niswonger Campus)
 New Tazewell-Claiborne County
 Sevierville
 Newport-Cocke County

Notable alumni

Rodney Atkins, country music musician 
Chad Bell, MLB pitcher 
Tilman Goins, former state representative 
Michael Harrison, politician
Brent Honeywell Jr., MLB pitcher
Ryan Kelly, MLB pitcher
Michael K. Locke, former state representative
Brett Martin, MLB relief pitcher
Steve Southerland, politician
Keith Westmoreland, former state representative

References

External links
 

Community colleges in Tennessee
Education in Greene County, Tennessee
Education in Hamblen County, Tennessee
Education in Sevier County, Tennessee
Education in Claiborne County, Tennessee
Education in Cocke County, Tennessee
Education in Hawkins County, Tennessee
Education in Grainger County, Tennessee
Education in Jefferson County, Tennessee
Education in Union County, Tennessee
Education in Hancock County, Tennessee
Educational institutions established in 1970
Universities and colleges accredited by the Southern Association of Colleges and Schools
Buildings and structures in Greene County, Tennessee
Buildings and structures in Hamblen County, Tennessee
Buildings and structures in Sevier County, Tennessee
Buildings and structures in Claiborne County, Tennessee
Buildings and structures in Cocke County, Tennessee
Greeneville, Tennessee
Morristown, Tennessee
NJCAA athletics